The Mental Evaluation Unit (MEU), including the Systemwide Mental Assessment Response Team (SMART), is the police crisis intervention team of the Los Angeles Police Department (LAPD), working with people suspected of having a mental illness. The MEU mission is to reduce the potential for violence during police contacts involving people experiencing mental illness while simultaneously assessing the mental health services available to assist them. This requires a commitment to problem solving, partnership, and supporting a coordinated effort from law enforcement, mental health services and the greater community of Los Angeles.

The LAPD has deployed the MEU for over four decades to help uniformed field personnel manage mental health crisis issues.  In January 1993, the Los Angeles County Department of Mental Health and the LAPD enhanced the MEU by committing personnel and resources to staff SMART. These co-deployed field response units formed the basis of the initial 1993 Mental Illness Project.

The Mental Illness Project is a co-response model. This means that police officers and mental health clinicians are housed out of the same building and respond to calls as a team. Officers and clinicians develop management schemes which employ an array of options from referrals for service, hospitalization and or management of the subject within the jail system.

In 2005, the Case Assessment Management Program (CAMP) was added to the MEU and the Mental Illness Project as a mental illness investigative follow-up team. Staffed by sworn investigators and LACDMH clinicians, its primary function is to identify those persons experiencing a mental illness, who make frequent use of police and fire emergency services, and/or who are at risk for violent encounters with police officers, e.g. Target School Violence, Suicide Jumpers, and Suicide by Cop.

In April 2008, the MEU partnered with the LAPD Threat Management Unit (TMU) to co-deploy with each other due to the fact that stalking suspects often experiencing some form of mental instability, and workplace violence suspects experience some form of mental health crisis when they make threats and when they are engaging in acts of violence. Both the MEU and TMU comprise the Crisis Response Support Section (CRSS).

Further insight relative to the MEU can be found within the following governmental publications:
 A Guide to Implementing Police-Based Diversion Programs for People with Mental Illness, by Melissa Reuland, Police Executive Research Forum – 2004
Enhancing Success of Police-Based Diversion Programs for People with Mental Illness, by Melissa Reuland and Jason Cheney, Police Executive Research Forum – May 2005
Department of Justice, Bureau of Justice Assistance, Improving Responses to People with Mental Illnesses, Strategies for Effective Law Enforcement Training 2008.
 Department of Justice, Bureau of Justice Assistance, Improving Responses to People with Mental Illnesses, The Essential Elements of a Specialized Law Enforcement–Based Program, 2008.
 Department of Justice, Bureau of Justice Assistance, Law Enforcement Responses to People with Mental Illness, A Guide to Research-Informed Policy and Practice, 2009.
 Department of Justice, Bureau of Justice Assistance, Improving Responses to People with Mental Illnesses, Tailoring Law Enforcement Initiatives to Individual Jurisdictions, 2010.
 Consent Decree Mental illness Reports.

References

External links
 Official website
 Official website content
 Consensus Project website
 Dmh.ca
 Gainscenter.samhsa.gov

Los Angeles Police Department units
Mental health in the United States